The 8240th Army Unit also known as 8240th AU was a gurrilla unit. They specialized in Guerrilla warfare, they were based in South Korea , US Army adviors trained South Korean troops.

History 
The one of predecessors of 8240th Army Unit was Korea Liaison Office formed in 1949.

In July 1951, Korea Liaison Office was incorporated into the 8240th Army Unit.

 The 8240th AU has mainly trained South Korean troops, they also used Guerrilla warfare as their main tactic. The Captain Donald Seibert lead the 8240th AU. There were 4 Donkey Units.   

The Unit was changed the name to United Nation Partisan Forces Korea in November 1952.

Units
Donkey units (1–21) and Wolfpack units (1–8) were main guerrilla units. Donkey-3 and Donkey-4 unit's nickname was White Tiger.

They all had the same job and task.

Heritage and commemoration
A documentary about the unit has been produced by the History Channel as part of their Heroes under fire series.

The unit is widely seen as the second steppingstone towards the setting up of a permanent special forces doctrine in the US Army.

See also
 Korea Liaison Office
 Joint Advisory Commission, Korea
 United Nations Partisan Infantry Korea
 Merrill Newman

References

Further reading 
 Facets of the U.S. Army Guerrilla Commands in Korea - U.S. ARMY SPECIAL OPERATIONS COMMAND HISTORY OFFICE
 White tigers : my secret war in North Korea / Ben S. Malcom, with Ron Martz.
 Guerrilla Warfare History of Korean War - Institute for Military History in South Korea Ministry of National Defense 
 8240 부대와 미군 말콤 중위의 인연
 백호 게릴라 부대 활약상과 말콤 전 대령의 회고
 Unforgotten fighter of Korean war: U.S. pensioner a POW at 85

United States Army
Special forces groups of the United States Army
Army reconnaissance units and formations
Military units and formations of South Korea in the Korean War
Military units and formations of the United States in the Korean War
United Nations Partisan Infantry Korea